Zira may refer to:

Places
 Zirə, Azerbaijan
 Zira, Iran (disambiguation), places in Iran
 Zira, Punjab, a town in Ferozepur district of Punjab, India

Other uses
 Zira (The Lion King II), a lioness and the antagonist in Disney's 1998 direct-to-video animated film The Lion King II: Simba's Pride
 Zira (Planet of the Apes), a chimpanzee character in the novel and movie series Planet of the Apes
 Zira FK, an Azerbaijani football club
 Zira, a TellMe voice persona
 Zira or cumin, a plant used in Indian cuisine
 "Zira (Call Out My Name)", a song by Redd Kross on the album Third Eye

See also
 
 Zira'a, Homs Governorate, Syria